{{Infobox officeholder 
| name           = Mojtaba Hosseini
| image          = Mojtaba Hosseini 1394 (cropped).jpg
| office1 = Member of the Assembly of Experts 
| term_start1 = 24 May 2016
| term_end1 = 
| majority1 = 
| constituency1 = Razavi Khorasan Province
| term_start2 = 23 February 1999
| term_end2 = 20 February 2007
| majority2 = 
| constituency2 = Sistan and Baluchestan Province
| Title          = Ayatollah
| other_names    =  <big>سید مجتبی حسینی</big>
| religion       = Twelver Shi'a Islam
| alias          = 
| location       =  Qom
| ordination     = 
| post           = 
| birth_date  = 1954
| birth_place = Mashhad, Iran
| death_date  = 
| death_place = 
| website     = 
}} Seyed Mojtaba Hosseini ''' (Born 1954 in Mashhad) a member of the Assembly of Experts (third and fifth period ) and the supreme leader's representative in Iraq and Syria.

Biography 
Seyed Mojtaba Hosseini family-Sistani was born in Mashhad and a clerical family. His father, Syed Jalil Hosseini of clerics in Mashhad during the Pahlavi regime after accepting the invitation of the government during a meeting with Mohammad Reza Pahlavi, prayer in the mosque Goharshad for his ban and then in the mosque Tehranis resident of Mashhad to bring the congregation to pay. Syed Jalil Hosseini Seyed Mojtaba father as a teenager to study theology in Mashhad migration of our city and in the presence of Mirza Mehdi Esfahani was the degree of ijtihad.

Professors 
 Abbas Vaez-Tabasi
 Abolghasem Khazali
 Morteza Motahhari
 Mohammad-Reza Golpaygani
 Jawad Tabrizi
 Hossein Vahid Khorasani

Records 
At the same time in 1997, he taught at the seminary and university for seven years,and was a representative of the Sunni leadership in the Sistan-Baluchistan province. He then served as the representative of the Syrian leadership that this period coincides with the recent crises in Syria and Lebanon. After the death of Ayatollah Sheikh Mahdi Asefi was appointed as the representative of the Supreme Leader in Iraq.

References 

Living people
Iranian grand ayatollahs
People of the Iranian Revolution
Iranian revolutionaries
People from Mashhad
Members of the Assembly of Experts
Iranian prisoners and detainees
1954 births
Representatives of the Supreme Leader